Strontium nitride, Sr3N2, is produced by burning strontium metal in air (resulting in a mixture with strontium oxide) or in nitrogen. Like other metal nitrides, it reacts with water to give strontium hydroxide and ammonia:

Sr3N2 + 6 H2O → 3 Sr(OH)2 + 2 NH3

See also 

 Beryllium nitride
 Magnesium nitride
 Calcium nitride
 Barium nitride

References

Nitrides
Strontium compounds